St Agatha's Church may refer to :


England
 St Agatha's, Landport, Portsmouth, England, a Roman Catholic parish church
 St Agatha's Church, Sparkbrook, Birmingham, England, a Church of England parish church
 St Agatha's Church, Coates, West Sussex, England
St Agatha's Roman Catholic Church, Kingston upon Thames, London, England
Abbey church of St Agatha, Easby

Elsewhere
 Sant'Agata de' Goti, Rome, Italy
 St. Agatha's Episcopal Church, DeFuniak Springs, Florida, United States

See also
 St. Agatha – St. James Church, Philadelphia, Pennsylvania, United States, a Roman Catholic church
 Filialkirche St. Agatha, Oberehe-Stroheich, Rhineland-Palatinate, Germany 
St Agatha's chapel, Mdina
St Agatha's Chapel, Żurrieq
Cathedral of St Agatha, Catania